Passion Dance is a 1978 live album by the jazz pianist McCoy Tyner, his fourteenth release on the Milestone label. It was recorded in July 1978 at the Live Under the Sky festival in Tokyo, Japan and features predominantly solo performances by Tyner, with two tracks including drummer Tony Williams and bassist Ron Carter.  A second album from this concert, Counterpoints, was released in 2004.

Reception
The AllMusic review by Scott Yanow states "All of Tyner's Milestone records of the 1970's are recommended and this is one of the better ones".

Track listing
 "Moment's Notice" (Coltrane) – 9:23
 "Passion Dance" – 11:47
 "Search for Peace" – 6:36
 "The Promise" (Coltrane) – 6:28
 "Song of the New World" – 7:12
All compositions by McCoy Tyner except as indicated
Recorded at "Live Under The Sky", Denen Colosseum, Tokyo, Japan, July 28, 1978

Personnel
McCoy Tyner – piano
Ron Carter – bass (tracks 1 & 5)
Tony Williams – drums (tracks 1 & 5)

References

Albums produced by Orrin Keepnews
1978 live albums
McCoy Tyner live albums
Milestone Records live albums